, born 15 February 1984, is a Japanese pianist. She is signed with the label Sony Music, and JESC ("Japan-Exchange-Seminar-Concerts" foundation, JESC Ongaku Bunka Shinkōkai) is her acting agency.

She was born Risa Nakazono, and the Westernized "Lisa" spelling appeared on her first CD release. She lives in Tokyo.

Biography
Born in Kanagawa, Japan in 1984, Lisa Nakazono started piano lessons at age four. In 2005, she applied for the "master class" program (piano division), sponsored by the Tokyo International Association of Artists (TIAA), and qualified with the top score, winning а full scholarship to study at the Moscow Conservatory.

In February 2008 she took first place in the first annual Elena Richter International Piano Competition held in Tokyo, named in honor of the piano professor at the Moscow Conservatory. That same year, while still attending college at the Toho Gakuen School of Music (in Chōfu, Tokyo) she made her professional performance debut with the concert series "Lisa's twinkling classics," which was backed by the Yamaha Corporation.

Around this time, as a senior in college, she signed with the record label (Aniplex/Sony Music) and in March 2009 when she graduated from Toho Gakuen, released her first CD entitled Chopin de Ghibli. This recording features piano solo versions of songs and music from the animation of Hayao Miyazaki's Studio Ghibli, such as "Day of the River" from Spirited Away and the title track from Ponyo, arranged in the style of Polish composer Frédéric Chopin. She was selected to perform at the Yokosuka Arts Theatre on September 23, 2009, as part of the "Fresh Artists from Yokosuka" series, and in the catch copy she was touted as a "richly expressive and attention-grabbing young female talent".

In January 2010, her second album "Chopin de Hoshi ni negai o"' was released. It features a Chopinesque rendition of the title track "When You Wish upon a Star" as well as other tunes from Disney studio's animated works, musicals and entertainment films. Her concert tour "Fantastic Chopin 2010" that year commemorated the 200th anniversary of the birth of Chopin. Also the anime series  had a run this year, for which she recorded as background music her performances of Liszt's "La Campanella" and Beethoven's Piano Sonata no. 21, "Waldstein".

In 2011, she gave another commemorative tour, this time paying homage to the bicentennial of the other great Hungarian composer, Franz Liszt. She also co-participated in "Bravo! Piano 2011" tour across the Japan, alongside artists such as Ai Kawashima.

In 2012, she gave a tour commemorating the 150th birthday anniversary of Debussy, and took part in the Japanese music festival "7th Sendai Classic Festival 2012."

Discography
 Chopin de GHIBLI (2009.03.18)
 Music from the animation of Studio Ghibli, in Chopin-style arrangement.　　
 
 Chopin de Hoshi ni negai o (2010.01.27)
"When You Wish Upon A Star, in Chopin-style arrangement

Footnotes

Explanatory notes

Citations

External links
 Lisa Nakazono Official website
 Lisa Nakazono Official Facebook Page

1984 births
Japanese pianists
Japanese women pianists
Living people
People from Kanagawa Prefecture
Moscow Conservatory alumni
21st-century Japanese pianists
21st-century Japanese women musicians
21st-century women pianists